Queen Amanirenas (also spelled Amanirena), described by Strabo as being blind in one eye, was queen of the Kingdom of Kush from c. 40 BC to c. 10 BC.

Her full title was Amnirense qore li kdwe li ("Ameniras, qore and kandake"). Meroitic, the indigenous language of the kingdom of Kush, remains undeciphered; however, inscriptions giving Queen Amanirenas the title of "qore" as well as "kandake" suggest that she was an individually ruling queen.

Biography 
Queen Amanirenas is one of the most famous Meroitic queens because of her role in leading the Kushite army against the Romans in a war that lasted three years (25 BC to 22 BC). This war is largely responsible for halting Rome’s southward expansion in Africa. After an initial victory against Roman Egypt, Prefect Gaius Petronius drove the Kushite army from Egypt and established a new Roman frontier at Hiere Sycaminos (Maharraqa).

Strabo’s account of the Meroitic War led against the Roman Empire includes a queen named “Candace,” a Latinization of kandake. Her name appears on stelae alongside those of Teriteqas and Akinidad, but the precise relationship between these three is not entirely clear in the historical record; however, scholars generally consider Akinidad to be her son and Teriteqas to be her husband.

Strabo's Account (17.53-54)

Kushite Invasion of Egypt

According to Strabo's account, the Kushite forces launched an attack on Thebais and Syene while then-prefect Aelius Gallus was away fighting against in Arabia in 25 BC. They were successful in taking Syene, Elephantine, and Philae. As they took the city, they enslaved inhabitants and destroyed the statues of Caesar Augustus. Though Strabo does not mention it specifically, the head of one such statue was buried beneath the steps of a temple, resulting in its unique preservation. The bust remained intact throughout the centuries and is now displayed at the British Museum.

Petronius' Nubian Campaign
Strabo claims Gaius Petronius, the new prefect of Egypt, marched with “less than ten thousand infantry and eight hundred cavalry” against thirty thousand Kushite men in Syene. The Kushites fought with “large, oblong shields made of raw ox-hide” and simple weaponry such as axes, pikes, and swords. Because of this, they were overwhelmed by Petronius’ attack. Strabo describes the Kushite forces as “badly marshaled.”

The Kushite forces stated their invasion was due to an issue with the nomarchs, the traditional chief magistrate of Egypt; Strabo does not provide information on what the issue was. After Petronius’ victory, the Kushite army fled in various directions: some into the cities, some into the desert, and others onto a nearby island.

Strabo ascertains that “among these fugitives were the generals of Queen Candace,” queen of the Ethiopians. He describes her as “a masculine sort of woman, and blind in one eye.” Strabo is almost certainly referring to Amanirenas, who bore the title of kandake; "Candace” is a Latinization of her title and does not refer to a separate ruler. After capturing the fleeing forces, Petronius sent them to Alexandria to await judgment.

Amanirenas herself resided at Napata with her son. As Petronius approached, taking Pselchis and Premnis along the way, Amanirenas dispatched envoys and the message that she would return both the captives taken in Syene and the statues of Caesar. Her entreaty was ignored and the city was razed. Of the surviving captives he took, some were sold and others sent to Augustus as prisoners of war.

In response, Amanirenas led a second attack against the forces of Petronius left behind at Premnis. Strabo states she had “many thousands of men.” Petronius outmaneuvered Amanirenas and arrived at Premnis first, securing it against her attack. Amanirenas sent ambassadors, which Petronius had escorted to Augustus who had arrived sometime before this assault. Augustus imposed no further tributes and fulfilled the ambassadors’ wishes.

Ensuing Peace Treaty 
After the success of Petronius’ Nubian campaign, the Roman Empire’s southern border moved beyond Egypt to Primis (Qasr Ibrim). The resulting peace treaty saw part of the Thirty-Mile Strip, including Primis, evacuated by the Romans. The Meroites were exempt from paying tribute to the Empire. The treaty allowed the Romans to continue to occupy the Dodekashoinos (“Twelve-Mile Lands”) as a military border zone. The Roman frontier was then moved near Hiere Sycaminos (Maharraqa).

This treaty remained active until the end of the third century AD, with relations between the Kushites and Roman Egypt remaining generally peaceful during this time. The kingdom of Kush remained a formidable power until its decline during the second century CE.

Meroë Head 
The head of Augustus preserved by Amanirenas, referred to as the Meroë Head, was discovered by British archaeologist John Garstang in 1910. The glass, metal, and crystal eyes of the statue, which are frequently lost in similar pieces, remained intact due to its burial. The portrait is done in the Greek style, evoking youth and power. The head itself is made of bronze, larger-than-life, and similar in style to the Augustus Prima Porta. The eyes are made of calcite, metal rings, and glass.

The head was buried beneath the steps of a Meroitic temple dedicated to Victory, likely in an attempt to subjugate Augustus in the mind of the Kushite people and establish Rome as a defeated power. Frescoes within the temple itself possibly depict Roman prisoners of war standing before a ruling Kushite, possibly Akinidad.

The excavation of Meroë (Nubia) was funded by the Sudan Excavation Committee. After the Meroë Head’s discovery, it was gifted to the British Museum where it still resides today.

Hamadab Stella 
The Hamadab Stela, which dates to the first century BC, is made of sandstone. There are forty-five rows of Meroitic text, cursive and incised. The text mentions both Queen Amanirenas and King Akinidad, presumably her husband. The incised image of the couple, which features some deities, is lost; only the legs remain visible.

The stela was discovered by John Garstang, the archaeologist responsible for discovering the Meroë Head, in 1914. The stela stood at the doorway of a small temple, accompanied by a second stela on the opposite side. The stela is roughly two meters tall and one meter wide. It is incised with the Meroitic language.

The deities incised alongside Amanirenas and Akinidad are possibly Amun and Mut; the latter figure is holding an ankh, the Egyptian symbol of eternal life. Shackled prisoners are depicted beneath the ruling couple and the deities. Because the stela depicts the ruling couple with bound prisoners and dates to the first century BC, scholars believe the stela may provide a Kushite account of the campaign against Rome. It features the Meroitic term “Areme,” which may translate as Rome.

If the inscription discusses the Roman campaign, its translation is of vital importance for scholarship. The only extant descriptions of the Meroitic-Roman conflict are Roman in origin and often rife with propaganda.

Legacy 
Though initially obscure, Amanirenas has become a popular figure due to recent popular publications such as Rejected Princesses: Heroines, Hellions, and Heretics by Jason Porath and renewed scholarly interest in resistance to Roman rule. The introduction of post-colonial studies and a focus on identity under imperial rule within the Classics and the resulting publications have broadened understanding of the subject, but information about Amanirenas remains limited due to Meroitic being an undeciphered language. Strabo's account being the only translated primary source to discuss Amanirenas at length further limits understanding of the one-eyed queen.

See also
Kush
Kandake
List of monarchs of Kush
Meroe Head
Gaius Petronius
Augustus

References

Further reading 
László Török, in: Fontes Historiae Nubiorum Vol. II, p. 723-725 (Bergen, 1996).

External links

"Women in power 500-B.C. 1" at Guide2womenleaders.com
Stela found in Naqa
Chicago Oriental Institute Archive: picture of her destroyed pyramid
 A short animation about Amanirenas.
"The Queen of Kush" - A novel about Queen Amanirenas' war with the Roman Empire

57 BC births
10 BC deaths
1st century BC in Roman Egypt
1st-century BC monarchs of Kush
1st-century BC women rulers
Nubian women in warfare
Queens of Kush
Ancient queens regnant
Blind royalty and nobility